Náměstí Republiky may refer to:

 Náměstí Republiky, Prague
 Náměstí Republiky (Prague Metro)
 Náměstí Republiky, Plzeň

See also
Republic Square (disambiguation)
Praça da República (disambiguation)
Plaza de la República (disambiguation)
Piazza della Repubblica (disambiguation)